The Light heavyweight competition at the 2019 AIBA Women's World Boxing Championships was held between 6 and 13 October 2019.

Schedule
The schedule was as follows:

All times are Irkutsk Time (UTC+8)

Results

References

External links
Draw

Light heavyweight